William Hackett may refer to:

 William Hackett (VC) (1873–1916), English recipient of the Victoria Cross
 William Hackett (priest) (1878-1954), Irish Jesuit
 William Hackett (mountaineer) (1918–1999), American mountaineer
 Sir William Hackett (judge) (1824-1877), Chief Justice of Fiji and the Chief Justice of Ceylon
 William Stormont Hackett (1868-1926), Mayor of Albany New York

See also
 William Hacket (died 1591), English puritan and religious fanatic